Ana Waleska Soto Abril (born 14 August 1990) is a Guatemalan sport shooter and former softball player. She competed in the women's trap event at the 2020 Summer Olympics.

Soto started out as a softball player, winning a bronze medal with the Guatemalan national team at the 2010 Central American and Caribbean Games in Puerto Rico, although she learned the sport of shooting as a teenager through a summer camp. She earned a scholarship to play softball at Martin Methodist College in the United States, where she began shooting again. Soto competed in both sports at the 2014 Central American and Caribbean Games, winning a silver medal in the women's trap event. She won a bronze medal in the same event at the 2017 Bolivarian Games, and placed fourth at the 2019 Pan American Games to qualify for the delayed 2020 Summer Olympics.

References

External links
 

1990 births
Living people
Guatemalan female sport shooters
Guatemalan softball players
Olympic shooters of Guatemala
Shooters at the 2020 Summer Olympics
Competitors at the 2010 Central American and Caribbean Games
Competitors at the 2014 Central American and Caribbean Games
Central American and Caribbean Games silver medalists for Guatemala
Central American and Caribbean Games bronze medalists for Guatemala
Central American and Caribbean Games medalists in shooting
Central American and Caribbean Games medalists in softball
Shooters at the 2019 Pan American Games
Sportspeople from Guatemala City
20th-century Guatemalan women
21st-century Guatemalan women